Black police may refer to either:

National Black Police Association (UK)
National Black Police Association (United States)
The Black and Tans
Black Cop, a song by KRS-One
Black Cop, a 2017 film
Hong Kong Black Police

The term may also refer to:

Black and white (police vehicle)
Police van#Black Maria